Alexander Carey Shrapnel (born 6 October 1979) is an English actor and voice actor.

Early life
Shrapnel was born on 6 October 1979 in London, the second of three boys for actor John Shrapnel and Francesca Ann (née Bartley). He is the brother of director/writer Tom Shrapnel and writer Joe Shrapnel and, through his mother, the grandson of Academy Award-nominated actress Deborah Kerr. He graduated from the Guildhall School of Music & Drama.

Career
He has appeared in many film and television roles such as K-19: The Widowmaker, Nine Lives, Thunderbirds, Breakfast on Pluto, Flyboys, Ministry of Mayhem and The Last Detective. He also appeared in the Doctor Who audio play, Shadow of the Past.

Shrapnel's Hotspur in Henry IV in the Royal Shakespeare Company's critically acclaimed 2008 production was described as 'thrillingly charismatic'. He also has appeared on stage in 2011 in Terence Rattigan's The Deep Blue Sea performed at the West Yorkshire Playhouse. He is quoted as saying "Before going in you set a high bar for yourself, but you've just got to get into rehearsals, do the work and hope it comes together".

According to actress Emily Blunt on The Late Late Show with Craig Ferguson, he once played Romeo to her Juliet in a production of the Shakespeare play.

Filmography

Film

Television

References

External links
 Lex Shrapnel - Fan Website
 

1979 births
Living people
20th-century English male actors
21st-century English male actors
English male film actors
English male television actors
English people of Scottish descent
Male actors from London
People from Birmingham, West Midlands